Ana Ines Amelia Temple Arciniega (born 20 January 1959) is a Peruvian businesswoman and author.

Family and education 
Temple is the daughter of Alejandro Temple Sanchez-Checa and Nelly Amelia Arciniaga Rojas. She was educated at Colegio Santa Úrsula, Lima. She has a BS in business administration from New York University in New York City, and an MBA from the Adolfo Ibañez School of Management in Miami, Florida. She has 3 children.

Career 
Temple set up the Peruvian branch of Drake Beam Morin, a human resources company, in 1993. In 2011, Drake Beam Morin was acquired by Adecco and merged with its existing Lee Hecht Harrison subsidiary.

Temple wrote Usted S.A - Empleabilidad & Marketing Personal in 2010; it has gone through several editions and was among the top selling books in Perú for 2013.

Temple has chaired the board of directors of Perú2021.

References

External links
Ines Temple Home Page

Living people
Peruvian_women_in_business
Chilean businesspeople
1959 births